Capitán FAP Leonardo Alvariño Herr Airport  is an airport serving the city of San Ramón in the Junín Region of Peru.

The airport is in the valley of the Chanchamayo River. There is distant mountainous terrain in all quadrants, and a hill immediately to the east.

See also

Transport in Peru
List of airports in Peru

References

External links
OpenStreetMap - San Ramón
OurAirports - San Ramón

Airports in Peru
Buildings and structures in Junín Region